Manos a la obra is a Spanish comedy television series starring Ángel de Andrés and Carlos Iglesias that originally aired on Antena 3 from 1998 to 2001.

Premise 
The fiction follows the mishaps of a duo of clumsy and lazy bricklayers, Manolo and Benito.

Cast 
 Ángel de Andrés as Manolo Jumilla Pandero.
 Carlos Iglesias as Benito Lopera Perrote.
 Fernando Cayo as Faustino, "Tino".
 Jorge Calvo as "Tato" Leal Jumilla.
 Nuria González as Adela.
 Kim Manning as Tania.
  as Carmina Perrote.
 Evaristo Calvo.
 Silvia Marsó as Noelia.
 Jesús Vázquez as Tony.
  as Luciano.
  as Loren.
  as Nico.
 Tomás Sáez as Antonio.
  as Rosalía.

Production and release 
The series was created by Vicente Escrivá and Ramón de Diego. José Antonio Escrivá (Vicente Escrivá's son) directed the series until he was ditched in 1999 in favour of Carlos Serrano and Pablo Ibáñez. It was produced by Aspa Vídeo and Acanto Cine & Vídeo.

The series premiered on Antena 3 on 8 January 1998. The original broadcasting run ended on 22 July 2001 after 6 seasons and 130 episodes. It averaged 4,186,000 viewers and a 28.4 % audience share. It sparked a sequel series, which premiered in 2006.

References 

1998 Spanish television series debuts
1990s Spanish comedy television series
1990s workplace comedy television series
2000s Spanish comedy television series
2000s workplace comedy television series
2001 Spanish television series endings
Antena 3 (Spanish TV channel) network series
Spanish-language television shows